
Paṭṭiṉappālai is a Tamil poem in the ancient Sangam literature. It contains 301 lines, of which 296 lines are about the port city of Kaveripoompattinam, the early Chola kingdom and the Chola king Karikalan. The remaining 5 lines are on the proposed separation by a man who wants to move there and the separation pain of his wife who would miss her husband's love. Of the 301 lines, 153 are in the vanci meter and the rest are in akaval. It is sometimes referred to as Vancinetumpattu, or the "long song in the vanci meter". The poem was composed by Katiyalur Uruttirankannanar, sometime around 1st century and 2nd century CE, states Kamil Zvelebil – a Tamil literature scholar.

The title Pattinappalai is combination of two words, pattinam (city) and palai (desert, metonymically "separation, love division"). The poem has a lengthy initial section on the harbor capital city of the ancient Cholas, Kaveripattinam, also referred to as Kavirippattinam, Kaveripumpattinam, Pugar, Puhar, or Kakanthi. This section contains a vivid description of a busy maritime coastal city, the big ships, the fishermen, the markets, its festivals and feasts, and the people. The lines about the lover's separation appear in lines 261–264 and lines 379–382. Between these, is the description of the generous Chola king and the kingdom. The husband is so moved by his wife's inconsolable pain that he postpones his move.

The poem is an important and rich source of historical information about the ancient Chola kingdom and its capital city. The Pattinappalai mentions the city's music and dance traditions, cock and ram fights, the thriving alcohol and fisheries business, the overseas and domestic trade among the Indian peninsular port cities. There is a mention of goods coming from Burma, Ceylon, northern India, and the River Ganges valley. The section on the Chola king describe the king's initial struggles to gain his throne because neighboring kingdoms had invaded the Chola territory when he was a child. The poem then describes the wars he won, the slaves he took, his return to the throne, his generosity to his people, the artists and the bards.

The Pattinappalai gives a window into the ethical premises that were idealised by the ancient Tamil society in the Chola kingdom. The peaceful lives of the people is thus described, according to JV Chellaih:

For the merchants plying their trade, some of the lines in this poem state:

This ancient poem regained popularity during 9th to 12th century CE, the later Chola empire, when the court poets used it glorify the ancient heritage and success of the dynasty centuries ago. It is quoted in Tamil literature and temple inscriptions composed during the 11th and 12th century. The Pattinappalai is notable for its mention of the early Chola kingdom as a cosmopolitan region, where Buddhist, Hindu and Jain monasteries and communities co-existed. It mentions the worship of Murugan.

According to scholars such as Miksic, Yian, Meenakshisundararajan and others, the Pattinappalai is an early textual evidence of the significance of overseas trade that economically and culturally linked Tamil regions with southeast Asian communities in Indonesia, Thailand and Malaysia. One of the trade destinations "Kadaram" in this poem has long been proposed to be the same as modern Kedah in Malaysia, starting with the proposal of K A Nilakanta Sastri in his History of Sri Vijaya. The poem is also an early record attesting to the cultural practice of dedicating memorial Hero stones in South India (lines 88–89).

See also
 Eighteen Greater Texts
 Sangam literature

Notes

References

Bibliography

 
 Mudaliyar, Singaravelu A., Apithana Cintamani, An encyclopaedia of Tamil Literature, (1931) - Reprinted by Asian Educational Services, New Delhi (1983)
 
 
 Selby, Martha Ann (2011) Tamil Love Poetry: The Five Hundred Short Poems of the Aiṅkuṟunūṟu, an Early Third-Century Anthology. Columbia University Press, 

 
 
 

Sangam literature